83 Armoured Regiment is an armoured regiment of the Indian Army.

Formation 

83 Armoured Regiment was stood up on 1 January 1976 in Ahmednagar.

History 
The Regiment was equipped with T-55 tanks with which it served till conversion to the T-90 tanks in June 2010.

The Regiment was presented the ‘President's Standards’ at Babina, Uttar Pradesh on 19 October 2010 by the then President of India, Mrs. Prathiba Patil. Five armoured regiments of the 31 Armoured Division (83, 12, 13, 15 and 19 Armoured Regiments) were awarded the colours.

The Regiment had the honour of participating in the annual Republic Day parade in 2015.

Equipment
The Regiment is presently equipped with the T-90 tank.

Regimental Insignia
The Regimental insignia consists of crossed lances with pennons of the regimental colours with numeral "83" inscribed on the crossing of the lances, mounted by an 'armoured fist' and a scroll with the words 'Armoured Regiment' at the base. The shoulder title consists of the numeral "83" in brass.

References

Military units and formations established in 1976
Armoured and cavalry regiments of the Indian Army from 1947